2-Aminoacetanilide is a chemical compound which is a amino derivative of acetanilide and ortho-isomer of aminoacetanilide.  There are two other isomers of aminoacetanilide, 3-aminoacetanilide and 4-aminoacetanilide. Aminoacetanilide derivatives are important synthetic intermediates in heterocyclic and aromatic synthesis. These derivatives have found applications in pharmaceutical industry and dyes and pigment industry.

Synthesis 
Catalytic hydrogenation of 2-nitroacetanilide using 10%Pd/C gives 2-aminoacetanilide.

Uses 

2′-Aminoacetanilide is starting material for the synthesis of 2-methylbenzimidazole, N-(2-(1,3-Dimethyl-2,4-dioxo-5-phenyl-3,4-dihydro-1H-pyrrolo[3,4-d]pyrimidin-6(2H)-yl)phenyl)-5-methylfuran-2-carboxamide, and azobenzothiazole dyes, N-[2-(6-nitrobenzothiazol-2-ylazo)phenyl]acetamide and N-[2-(benzothiazol-2-ylazo)phenyl]acetamide. Benzimidazoles have been synthesized by cyclization of 2′-aminoacetanilide by CO2 in the presence of H2 using RuCl2(dppe)2 as the catalyst.

References 

Acetanilides
Anilines